Paschalis Tountouris (born 25 April 1978) is a very influential International football agent and politician of Greek nationality. He is registered in multiple Football Federations. Tountouris is the owner of Prosport, an international agency which was founded in 2004 and successfully concluded over 300 football transfers around the world. Tountouris represents a number of well known players and coaches including former Greek Captain Giorgos Karagounis, Greek Internationals Konstantinos Tsimikas, Dimitris Kolovos, Fiorin Durmishaj, upcoming stars Marios Vrousai and Anastasios Chatzigiovanis, South African stars Andile Jali and Bernard Parker, Zimbabwean Captain Knowledge Musona, manager Giannis Anastasiou and others.

Early career
Tountouris began his career as the Sports Director of Aris Thessaloniki F.C. and later as the Head of World Football Division of Prosport International, the largest agency in Africa which is run by infamous South African agent Mike Makaab.
During his involvement with African football he successfully transferred to Europe several International stars including Knowledge Musona, Jabu Pule, Collins Mbesuma, Bernard Parker, Nasief Morris, Jonathan Mensah and more.

Anti-racism activity
On 14 April 2008 Tountouris organized a conference in Athens Metropolitan Hotel in order to mobilize the Greek society in the battle against racism. Many politicians, journalists and sports celebrities attended the day conference including the President of the Hellenic Football Federation Sofoklis Pilavios, International footballers Manucho, Nasief Morris and Simão Mate Junior, South African Olympic Champion Elana Meyer, Apostolos Tzitzikostas, Yannis Moralis and more.

Tsimikas transfer to Liverpool F.C.

In August 2020 Tountouris concluded as an agent the most prestigious transfer of a Greek player with the signing of Konstantinos Tsimikas to 
Liverpool F.C. for a fee believed to be around €17mil from Olympiacos Piraeus

Politics
In February 2019 Tountouris was announced as a councilor candidate for the municipality of Thessaloniki lining up with the party of New Democracy (Greece)
On 25 September 2019 Tountouris was appointed by MP Λευτέρης Αυγενάκης as a debuty chairman of E.A.K (National Sports Centers of Thessaloniki)

References

1978 births
Living people
Greek sportspeople
Anti-racism activists
Association football agents
Greek sportsperson-politicians